Rhinocricidae is a family of millipedes, that occurs disjunctly in Malesia and neighbouring parts of Australasia and in the Neotropics. The family contains the following genera:

Acladocricus Brölemann, 1913
Alcimobolus Loomis, 1936
Anadenobolus von Porat, 1876
Andocricus Chamberlin, 1955
Auracricus Pérez-Asso, 1998
Australocricus Jeekel, 2001
Carlocricus Jeekel, 2001
Cubobolus Chamberlin, 1918
Desmocricus Carl, 1918
Eurhinocricus Brölemann, 1903
Fomentocricus Perez-Asso, 1998
Haitobolus Mauriès & Hoffman, 1998
Jobocricus Pérez-Asso, 1998
Leiocricus Loomis, 1936
Lissocricus Chamberlin, 1953
Metacricus Chamberlin, 1953
Neocricus Chamberlin, 1941
Nesobolus Chamberlin, 1918
Oxypyge Silvestri, 1896
Perucricus Kraus, 1954
Poecilocricus Schubart, 1962
Proporobolus Silvestri, 1897
Rhinocricus Karsch, 1881
Rhytidocricus Hoffman & Keeton, 1960
Salpidobolus Silvestri, 1897
Thyroproctus Pocock, 1894
Yucatobolus Chamberlin, 1938

References

Spirobolida
Millipede families